The Western Group is one of the island groups of the Azores, Portugal. It comprises the islands of Flores and Corvo, situated on the North American Continental Plate of the Mid-Atlantic Ridge.

References 

 
Islands of Macaronesia
Geography of Southwestern Europe